Saka – The Martyrs of Nankana Sahib is a Punjabi historical film about 1921 Nankana Sahib massacre directed and written by Jagmeet Singh Samundri, starring Mukul Dev, Aman Dhaliwal, Oshin Brar.

Plot
The film is about a massacre (Saka) that happened during Sikh protests of 1920-21 in peaceful efforts to liberate Gurdwara Janam Asthan at Nankana Sahib.

Cast
 Mukul Dev as Lachhman Singh Dharowali
 Aman Dhaliwal
 Oshin Brar
 Dev Kharoud as Kehar Singh
 Hardeep Gill
 Stass Klassen as British governor of Lahore (Edward Douglas MacLagan)
 Mahabir Bhullar as Mahant Narain Dass

Planning and Shooting
The set of Gurudwara Sahib was raised at cost of  spreading over 2.5 acres at village Ucha Pind, Phagwara by a team from Mumbai. Shooting was completed within 45 days as it rained incessantly during April 2015.

Release
It was released worldwide on 8 April 2016. Shiromani Gurdwara Parbandhak Committee and team of film were angered at Central Board of Film Certification of India for giving 'A' certification to the film and at British Censors for '15 rating' to the film.

Reception

Box office

References

External links
 

2016 films
Films about massacres of Sikhs
Punjabi-language Indian films
2010s Punjabi-language films
Films set in 1921
Films set in Punjab, Pakistan
Films set in the British Raj